The 18-pounder short gun was an intermediary calibre piece of artillery mounted on warships and merchantmen of the Age of sail. It was a lighter version of the 18-pounder long gun, compromising power and range for weight.

In his discussion of the single-ship action in which the French frigate Piémontaise captured the East Indiaman Warren Hastings on 11 June 1805, the naval historian William James compared the 18-pounder medium guns on Warren Hastings with the 18-pounder long guns that the British Royal Navy used.

Citations and references 
Citations

References

External links
  Jean Boudriot et Hubert Berti, L'Artillerie de mer : marine française 1650-1850, Paris, éditions Ancre, 1992 (notice BNF no FRBNF355550752).
  Jean Peter, L'artillerie et les fonderies de la marine sous Louis XIV, Paris, Economica, 1995, 213 p..

Naval guns of France
138 mm artillery